Carpenter Mountain is a mountain peak in Jeff Davis County, Texas.

References

Landforms of Jeff Davis County, Texas
Mountains of Texas